Sørlle Buttress is a mountain rising above , between Mount Spaaman and Three Brothers in the Allardyce Range of South Georgia. It was surveyed by the South Georgia Survey in the period 1951-57 and named by the United Kingdom Antarctic Place-Names Committee for Petter Sørlle (1884–1922), a Norwegian whaling captain and inventor who, in 1922, took out a patent for his whaling slipway. Sørlle was the first manager of the United Whalers station at Stromness.

References

Mountains and hills of South Georgia